The Horn–Vincent–Russell Estate is a historic mansion in Mission Hills, Kansas, U.S.. It was built from 1929 to 1931 for Phoebe and John Horn. It was designed by architect Edward Tanner in the Tudor Revival style. It has been listed on the National Register of Historic Places since July 25, 1997.

References

Houses on the National Register of Historic Places in Kansas
Tudor Revival architecture in the United States
Houses completed in 1929
Buildings and structures in Johnson County, Kansas
Historic districts on the National Register of Historic Places in Kansas